The following units and commanders of the Union Army fought at the Siege of Corinth (29 Apr-30 May 1862) of the American Civil War.  The Union Army had approximately 150,000 present for duty. The Confederate order of battle is shown separately. Order of battle compiled from the army organization during the siege.

Abbreviations used

Military Rank
 MG = Major General
 BG = Brigadier General
 Col = Colonel
 Ltc = Lieutenant Colonel
 Maj = Major
 Cpt = Captain
 Lt = Lieutenant

Other
 w = wounded
 mw = mortally wounded
 k = killed

Department of the Mississippi
MG Henry W. Halleck
Second-in-Command: MG Ulysses S. Grant
Chief of Staff and Chief Engineer: BG George W. Cullum
Chief of Cavalry: BG Andrew J. Smith
Chief Topographical Engineer: Col George Thom
Aide de Camp: Col Norton Parker Chipman
Assistant Adjutant General: Cpt John C. Kelton

District of West Tennessee

MG Ulysses S. Grant
Chief of Staff: Col Joseph D. Webster
Aide de Camp: Col James B. McPherson
Provost Marshal General: Col William S. Hillyer after 3 May
Provost Marshal General: Ltc DeWitt C. Anthony <small>until May'''</small>
Assistant Adjutant General: Cpt John A. Rawlins
Chief Commissary: Cpt John Parker Hawkins

Right Wing (Army of the Tennessee)

MG George H. ThomasOrganization of the Right Wing, Left Wing and Reserve, in front of Corinth MS, May 13, 1862
 Chief of Staff and Asst. Adjutant General: Cpt George E. Flynt

Reserves (Army of the Tennessee)
MG John A. McClernandOrganization of the Right Wing, Left Wing and Reserve, in front of Corinth, MS, May 13, 1862
Assistant Inspector General: Col Thomas E. G. Ransom

Center (Army of the Ohio)

MG Don Carlos Buell
Chief of Staff: Col James Barnet Fry
Assistant Inspector General: Maj Adam J. Slemmer
Assistant Inspector General: Cpt Charles Champion Gilbert
Assistant Quartermaster: Cpt Alvan C. Gillem (until May 1862)
Assistant Quartermaster: Cpt Andrew J. Mackay (May 1862)
Chief Engineer: Cpt James St. Clair Morton

Left Wing (Army of the Mississippi)

MG John PopeOrganization of the Army of the Mississippi April 30, 1862
Chief of Staff: BG Washington L. Elliott after 12 June
Assistant Adjutant General: Maj Speed Butler
Assistant Inspector General: Maj John M. Corse
Assistant Quartermaster: Cpt Philip H. Sheridan

Right Wing
MG William S. Rosecrans assigned 29 May

Left Wing
BG Schuyler Hamilton assigned 29 May

References

Sources
U.S. War Department, The War of the Rebellion: a Compilation of the Official Records of the Union and Confederate Armies, U.S. Government Printing Office, 1880–1901.
 Eicher, John H., and David J. Eicher. Civil War High Commands. Stanford, CA: Stanford University Press, 2001. .
Dyer, Frederick H. A compendium of the War of the Rebellion, Volume 1'', Des Moines IA: The Dyer Publishing Co.. 1908

American Civil War orders of battle